Parmenomorpha irregularis is a species of beetle in the family Cerambycidae. It was described by Blackburn in 1899. It is known from Australia.

References

Dorcadiini
Beetles described in 1899